Vadali is a village and former Rajput non-salute princely state on Saurashtra peninsula in Gujarat, western India.

History 
Vadali was a Seventh Class princely state, comprising only the village, in the Halar prant of Western Kathiawar, ruled by Jadeja Rajput Chieftains.

It had a population of 409 in 1901, yielding a state revenue of 6,435 Rupees (1903-4, mostly from land) and a paying a tribute of 324 Rupees, to the British and Junagadh State.

External links and Sources 
History
 Imperial Gazetteer, on dsal.uchicago.edu

Princely states of Gujarat
Rajput princely states